Trevor Gould (born 1951, Johannesburg) is a Canadian contemporary artist known for his sculptural and conceptual artworks.

Life
Trevor Gould was born in 1951 Johannesburg, South Africa. He studied at the University of South Africa and the Johannesburg College of Art.  He immigrated to Canada in 1980, where he earned a master's degree in art from Carleton University in 1987. Gould is based in Montreal, Quebec, where he is a professor of sculpture at Concordia University.

Work
Gould's work often involves the representation human, animal and anthropomorphic figures.

Exhibitions
Gould exhibited in the 1995 Johannesburg Biennale.

Collections
Gould's sculptures are included in several major museum collections, including the National Gallery of Canada, the Musée d'art contemporain de Montréal, the Musée national des beaux-arts du Québec and the Museum of Contemporary Art in Krakow.

References

External links
Official site

Canadian contemporary artists
1951 births
Canadian people of South African descent
Living people
People from Johannesburg
Academic staff of Concordia University
Artists from Montreal
Canadian sculptors
Canadian male sculptors